Nagyhegy is the Hungarian name for two villages in Romania:

 Măgureni village, Cernești Commune, Maramureș County
 Oraşu Nou-Vii village, Orașu Nou Commune, Satu Mare County